Wimbledon is a National Rail, London Underground, and Tramlink station located on Wimbledon Bridge, Wimbledon in London, and is the only station in London that provides an interchange between the London Underground and Tramlink. The station serves as a junction for services from the Underground's District line and National Rail operators (South Western Railway and Thameslink), as well as Tramlink services. The station is in Travelcard Zone 3.

The station has 11 platforms. Platforms 1–4 are for London Underground, platforms 5 and 8 are for inner suburban South Western Railway services, platform 9 is for Thameslink and platforms 10a and 10b are for Tramlink. Platforms 6 and 7 are adjacent to the fast tracks intended for express and outer suburban South Western Railway services, but most of these services only call at Wimbledon during the Wimbledon Tennis Championships or on Sundays for outer suburban services. Access to these platforms is via sliding gates through safety fencing installed in March 2014.

History
The first railway station in Wimbledon was opened on 21 May 1838, when the London and South Western Railway (L&SWR) opened its line from its terminus at Nine Elms in Battersea to Woking. The original station was to the south of the current station on the opposite side of the Wimbledon Bridge.

On 22 October 1855, the Wimbledon and Croydon Railway (W&CR) opened the West Croydon to Wimbledon Line to West Croydon via Mitcham and on 1 October 1868 the Tooting, Merton and Wimbledon Railway (TM&WR) opened a line to Streatham via Tooting Junction (now just Tooting).  They shared a detached platform slightly to the southwest of the main LSWR station, until the whole station was relocated to the northeast of Wimbledon Bridge for the opening of the District Railway.

The District line and Sutton loop

On 3 June 1889, the District Railway (DR, now London Underground's District line) opened the LSWR-built extension of its line from Putney Bridge, making Wimbledon station the new terminus of that branch and providing Wimbledon with a direct connection to the developing London Underground system. The station was rebuilt on its current site for the opening of this service.  District line steam-hauled services were replaced by electric services from 27 August 1905.

The station was rebuilt again with its current Portland stone entrance building by the Southern Railway (SR, the post grouping successor to the L&SWR) in the late 1920s as part of the SR's construction of the line to Sutton. Parliamentary approval for this line had been obtained by the Wimbledon and Sutton Railway (W&SR) in 1910, but work was delayed by World War I. From the W&SR's inception, the DR was a shareholder of the company and had rights to run trains over the line when built. In the 1920s, the London Electric Railway (LER, precursor of London Underground) planned, through its ownership of the DR, to use part of the route for an extension of the City and South London Railway (C&SLR, now the Northern line) to Sutton. The SR objected and an agreement was reached that enabled the C&SLR to extend as far as Morden in exchange for the LER giving up its rights over the W&SR route.

The SR subsequently built the line, one of the last to be built in the London area. It opened on 7 July 1929 to South Merton and to Sutton on 5 January 1930.

Tramlink 
On 2 June 1997, the West Croydon to Wimbledon Line was closed by Railtrack for conversion to operation as part of the Tramlink tram operations. Platform 10, originally the down platform for the Wimbledon & Croydon and Wimbledon & Sutton lines, was used for the single track terminus of Tramlink and rail tracks and infrastructure were replaced with those for the tram system. The new service opened on 30 May 2000. The other end of Platform 10 became a terminating bay for trains from the Tooting direction.  Platform 9, the W&C and W&S up platform, became a reversible platform for all Thameslink services between the Sutton and Tooting lines. 

To increase the capacity of Tramlink services, a second platform was built in place of the former Thameslink bay. The service was suspended between Dundonald Road and Wimbledon from 13 July until November 2015 for the work to be carried out. The original tram platform was renumbered to '10a' with the new part called '10b', opening on 2 November 2015. As a result, tram frequency increased from 8 per hour to 12 per hour from April 2016.

Forecourt

Before 14 March 2011, there was a roundabout outside the main entrance of the station to allow for vehicles to drop off passengers. This made the approach to the station somewhat cramped and not ideal during busy times. On 14 March 2011, vehicle access to the station's forecourt was permanently removed and the approach to the station was completely repaved. This made the much larger open space outside the station's entrance more ideal during busy times. These works were completed by June 2011 and the approach was hastily cleared in preparation for the Wimbledon Tennis Championships which would see a large increase in passengers passing through the station.

Laddie
Wimbledon station was also the haunt of a 'Railway Collection Dog'. Airedale Terrier "Laddie" was born in September 1948 and started work on Wimbledon Station in 1949, collecting donations on behalf of the Southern Railwaymen's Homes at Woking, via a box strapped to his back. He retired in 1956, having collected over £5,000 and spent the rest of his days with the residents at the Home.
Upon his death, in 1960, he was stuffed and returned to Wimbledon station. He continued to collect for the Homes, in a glass case situated on Platforms 7/8, until 1990, when he retired once more and became part of the National Railway Collection.

Accidents and incidents
On 12 October 1972, a freight train ran into the rear of an electric multiple unit that was standing at platform 10. Twelve people were injured. The accident was due to inattentiveness by the driver of the freight train.
On 6 November 2017, a passenger train formed of two Class 450 electric multiple units derailed near Wimbledon. Four people were injured and over 300 passengers were evacuated from the train.

Oyster cards
Wimbledon station presents an unusual procedure with the Oyster card pay-as-you-go electronic ticketing system.
Ordinarily, London Underground and National Rail passengers with Oyster cards must "touch in" at the start of their journey and "touch out" at the end: those who fail to "touch out" will be charged the maximum possible fare from their starting point. However, Tramlink passengers starting a journey at Wimbledon, after passing through the entry gates, will not be able to "touch out" at the end of their tram journey, since tram stops provide no facility to do so; instead they must "touch in" a second time on the tram platform at Wimbledon, after passing through the ticket barrier, and the system will then recognise that no train or tube journey has been made.

A similar issue arises for passengers arriving at Wimbledon by tram. Normally tram users do not touch out, but at Wimbledon they must do so to leave the station: touching out at the regular turnstile accomplishes this. If, however, a passenger touches their card at a standalone Oyster reader (such as the one by the manual gates), the system will see this as starting a new journey rather than ending one, and will deduct a maximum fare from the card.

Services

National Rail
South Western Railway operates frequent northbound services to London Waterloo and southbound services to Dorking, Richmond, Guildford, Cobham & Stoke D'Abernon, Hampton Court, Epsom, Shepperton, Chessington South and Woking. On Sundays only, hourly services run to Basingstoke and Alton.

During Wimbledon Tennis Championships, long distance trains may have an additional call made at Wimbledon.

London Underground
Frequent District line services operate to Tower Hill, Upminster and Edgware Road.

Tramlink

Future

If Crossrail 2 is built, new tunnels will be dug between Wimbledon and Raynes Park, calling at Wimbledon in tunnel and routing trains via  and central London to Hackney and beyond to either Alexandra Palace (in tunnel the whole way) or Hertford East (surfacing before Tottenham Hale, taking over the West Anglia Main Line north of there).

There is also a proposal for an extension of the Tramlink services running from Wimbledon to Sutton via Morden, St Helier and Rose Hill.

Connections
London Buses routes 57, 93, 131, 156, 163, 164, 200, 219 and 493 and night route N87 serve the station.
During the annual Wimbledon Championships there is a dedicated bus service between Wimbledon station and the Lawn Tennis grounds in Church Road.

See also
 Wimbledon TMD – located a little to the north of the station, on the west side of the main line tracks.

References

Bibliography

External links

 London Transport Museum Photographic Archive 
 . This entrance has been rebuilt as part of the Centre Court shopping centre development.
 Pictures of both entrances to station

Railway stations in the London Borough of Merton
Railway stations in Great Britain opened in 1838
Former London and South Western Railway stations
Former Tooting, Merton and Wimbledon Railway stations
Railway stations served by South Western Railway
Railway stations served by Govia Thameslink Railway
Tube stations in the London Borough of Merton
District line stations
Proposed Chelsea-Hackney Line stations
Tramlink stops in the London Borough of Merton
Buildings and structures in Wimbledon, London
James Robb Scott buildings